Charles Edward McLeod (24 October 1869 – 26 November 1918) was an Australian cricketer who played in 17 Test matches between 1894 and 1905.

McLeod was a patient batsman and accurate bowler who represented Victoria in first-class cricket from 1893 to 1905. His fielding and his running between wickets were affected by deafness. In the First Test of the 1897–98 Ashes series he was bowled by a no-ball, and having not heard the umpire's call, he left the wicket, thinking he was out, and was run out by the wicket-keeper, Bill Storer.

His best Test series was the 1897–98 Ashes series, when he scored 352 runs at an average of 58.66. Opening the batting in the Second Test on New Year's Day 1898, he scored his only Test century, 112 in 245 minutes, the only century of the match, which Australia won by an innings. He toured England in 1899 and 1905.

His brother Bob also played Test cricket for Australia.

References

External links

 

1869 births
1918 deaths
Australia Test cricketers
Victoria cricketers
Melbourne Cricket Club cricketers
Cricketers from Melbourne
Deaf cricketers
Australian deaf people
People from Port Melbourne